The 2015 MTV Video Music Awards Japan was held in Tokyo on November 26, 2015 and was hosted by Verbal from m-flo.

Presenters 
 Little Mix – presented Dempagumi.inc with their MTV EMA Best Japanese Act award
 Kazuto Koya – presented the Contribution to Entertainment Award

Winners and nominees 
Winners are highlighted in bold.

Notes

References

External links
2015 MTV Video Music Awards Japan

2015 in Japanese music
2015 music awards